Nuestra Belleza Tamaulipas 2011 was held in the Espacio Cultural Metropolitano of Tampico, Tamaulipas on July 7, 2011. At the conclusion of the final night of competition Karen Lizcano of Tampico was crowned the winner. Lizcano was crowned by outgoing Nuestra Belleza Tamaulipas titleholder Claudia González. Eleven contestants competed for the title.

Results

Placements

Special Awards

Judges
Cecy Gutiérrez - Television Hosstes
Silvia Ramírez - Actress
Manolo Barroso - Photographer

Background Music
Kika Edgar - "Sin Él", "Acaríciame" & “Que Ganas de no Verte Nunca Más”.

Contestants

References

External links
Official Website

Tamaulipas